Maine has the thirty-fourth highest per capita income in the United States of America.  In 2000, the state's average personal per capita income was $26,699 .  By 2003, that figure had risen to $29,851 .By 2011 it was $38,299

Maine counties ranked by per capita income

Note: Data is from the 2010 United States Census Data and the 2006-2010 American Community Survey 5-Year Estimates.

References

United States locations by per capita income
Economy of Maine
Income